The Manipur Public Service Commission is the Constitutional body constituted for recommending candidates for recruitment to various posts of the Government of Manipur (Gazetted posts). It also gives concurrence on the recommendation of Departmental Promotion Committee for appointment to various posts. The Commission also gives concurrence on the framing/ amendment of Recruitment Rules. It also tender advice to the Government Departments on service matters including disciplinary cases.

Organisation 

The Manipur Public Service Commission is constituted in pursuance of Article 315 of the Constitution of India and it has been functioning at Imphal since 1972. The Commission consists of a chairman and two members.

Directory of Chairman

Historical Perspective 

The Maharaja: During the British regime, the Maharja used to appoint the functionaries of the state. The Rules of Management of the State of Manipur, enforced on 14 September 1935, empowered the Maharaja to appoint the members of the Durbar, while a British officer acted as the president of the Durbar. After independence, for a brief period, the Manipur State Constituent Act 1947 provided for the formation of a Manipur State Appointment Board to be the "final authority" in all matters of appointments and  promotions.

The Chief Commissioner: Following merger into the Indian Union on 15 October 1949, Manipur became a centrally administered area, and remained so till 31 October 1956. During this period, the Chief Commissioner appointed the functionaries of Manipur, subject to the control of the Central Government.

Territorial Council: Manipur became a Union Territory under the States’ Re-Organisation Act 1956 and Constitution (Seventh Amendment) Act 1956. Under the Territorial Council Act 1956 Manipur was allowed to constitute the Territorial Council with limited administrative powers over transferred subjects and appointment of officials thereto. The Chief Commissioner, however, continued to function as the Chief appointing authority of the territory. Subsequently, the Territorial Council was abolished, and Manipur was placed under the Chief Commissioner from 11 May 1963 onwards with a Territorial Legislative Assembly and a Council of Ministers to assist him. Manipur  attained statehood on 21 January 1972 under the North- East Area (Re-organisation) Act 1971.

Manipur Public Service Commission: Under Article 315(4) of the Constitution, the Union Public Service Commission (UPSC) agreed to function as the Public Service Commission of the State of Manipur till 21 October 1972.

On 3 October 1972 the Governor of Manipur issued the order of constitution of the Manipur Public Service Commission under Article 318 with one Chairman and two Members. Shri B.K. Nehru, Governor of Manipur inaugurated the office of the Manipur Public Service Commission at a glittering function on 23 October 1972 at the Gandhi Memorial Hall, Imphal. Chief Minister, Shri Alimuddin presided over the function.

The Pioneering Brains: Shri G.B.K. Hooja MA, IAS was the inaugural Chairman of the Commission, while Shri Laishram Gopal Singh BA(Hon.), IPS and Shri Sibo Larho BA were the premiere members. Shri Karam Gourakishore Singh was the first Secretary of the Manipur Public Service Commission.

The Commission was housed in the Old Secretariat Building Complex for almost nine years; it was later shifted to the present location in January, 1981. Over the years, Manipur Public Service Commission have grown in stature with a senior IAS officer as the Secretary and an adequate number of officers and ancillary staff.

Functions of the Manipur Public Service Commission 

Article 320 of the Constitution of India lays down the functions of the State Public Service Commission. The functions of the State Public Service Commission are :

It is the duty of the State Public Service Commission to conduct examinations for appointment to the services of the state.
The State Public Service Commission will be consulted by the State Government on the following issues. 
on all matters relating to methods of recruitment to civil services and civil posts;
on the principles to be followed while making appointments, promotions and transfers to civil services and posts;
on all disciplinary matters of a person serving the Government of a state in a civil capacity, including memorials or petitions relating to such matters;
on any claim by a person, who is serving or has served the Government in a civil capacity that any cost, incurred by him in defending legal proceedings instituted against him in respect of acts done or purporting to have been done in the execution of his duty, shall be paid out of the consolidated fund of the state;
on any claim for the award of a pension in respect of injuries sustained by a person while serving under the Government in a civil capacity and any question as to the amount of any such award.

The State Public Service Commission functions as an advisory body. It is the duty of the State Public Service Commission to advise on any matter, referred to it by the Government.

See also

 List of Public service commissions in India

References

External links
Official website of Manipur Public Service Commission
Union Public Service Commission (UPSC)

Government of Manipur
State public service commissions of India
1972 establishments in Manipur